Termitinae is a subfamily of termites;  Amitermes and certain other genera (indicated here with a *) have previously been placed in the Amitermitinae, with some workers arguing that the latter have morphologically distinct characteristics and "some important attributes that affect soil".

Genera

References

External links

 en TolWeb
 Termite Catalogue

Termites